The 2015 CONSUR Women's Sevens was an Olympic qualification tournament for the 2016 Summer Olympics which was held in Santa Fe, Argentina from 5-7 June 2015.
The tournament was played in a round-robin format, with the top team qualifying directly to the Olympics, and the second and third place teams qualifying for the Final Olympic Qualification Tournament.

Colombia qualified for the Olympics while runners-up, Argentina, and third placed, Venezuela, qualified for the repechage tournament in Ireland.

Round-Robin

Final standings

See also
2015 CONSUR Sevens

References

Rugby sevens at the 2016 Summer Olympics – Women's tournament
2015 in women's rugby union
2015 rugby sevens competitions
International rugby union competitions hosted by Argentina
2015 in Argentine rugby union
Rugby sevens competitions in South America
2015 in South American rugby union